Ossu is a town in Ossu Subdistrict, Viqueque District, East Timor. Ossu is surrounded by several mountains: the Monte Mundo Perdido in the west, the Builo in the south, the Matebian massif in the east and the Fatu Laritame the north.

In the village there is a community health center, a helipad, a primary school, a pre-secondary school and a secondary school, the Sta. Teresina Colegio. There is the Catholic parish church of Sta. Teresinha do Menino Jesus (Teresa of the Child Jesus), which was inaugurated on 30November 2012, in the town.

References

External links 

 The Voice of the Liurai of Ossu

Viqueque Municipality
Populated places in East Timor